Colonel Karl Christ (15 June 1897 – ) was a World War I flying ace credited with five aerial victories. He returned to his nation's defense during early World War II.

Biography

Karl Christ was born on 15 June 1897 in Darmstadt, the Grand Duchy of Hesse, in the German Empire. In January 1915, he joined the Die Fliegertruppen des deutschen Kaiserreiches (the German flying service). He trained with Fliegerersatz-Abteilung (Replacement Detachment) 6 at Grosenheim.

He began service with Kampfgeschwader 6.  By 1916, he was serving in  Kampfgeschwader 5, a tactical bomber wing subordinate to the German Supreme Command. During this period, Christ won both classes of the Iron Cross.

Christ was commissioned a Leutnant on 23 March 1917 while serving with another bombing wing under the German Supreme Command—Bombengeschwader 2. In November 1917, he left Bogohl 2; the following month he joined Jagdstaffel 28, a single-seat fighter squadron, for service through war's end. Between 14 May and 14 October 1918, he had five of his six victory claims confirmed, though details are lacking on the last pair.

World War II service
From 1 April 1941 through February 1942, Karl Christ was an Oberst with a Stuka geschwader in North Africa.

Awards
Iron Cross (1914) 2nd and 1st Class
Hessische Tapferkeits-Medaille
German Cross in Gold on 5 June 1942 as Oberstleutnant in Sturzkampfgeschwader 3

References
Citations

Bibliography

 Franks, Norman; Bailey, Frank W.; Guest, Russell. Above the Lines: The Aces and Fighter Units of the German Air Service, Naval Air Service and Flanders Marine Corps, 1914–1918. Grub Street, 1993. , .
 

1897 births
Year of death missing
German World War I flying aces
Luftstreitkräfte personnel
Military personnel from Darmstadt
People from the Grand Duchy of Hesse
Recipients of the Gold German Cross
Recipients of the Iron Cross (1914), 1st class